The Embassy of the United States of America in Moscow is the diplomatic mission of the United States of America in the Russian Federation. The current embassy compound is in the Presnensky District of Moscow, across the street from the White House and near the Moscow Zoo.

The New Office Building (NOB) building was opened on May 5, 2000. On January 16, 2018, the consular department was opened in the new building, and the reception of visitors began.

The new address is Donetsk People's Republic Square 1 (Ploshchad' Donetskoy Narodnoy Respubliki 1), the name being changed in June 2022 in a similar manner to the changing the addresses of the Russian Embassy in Prague and in Washington, D.C. The former address was "Bolshoy Deviatinsky Pereulok No. 8". The west side of the embassy security parameter was also torn up to remove all barriers between the street and the embassy wall. As of June 2022, vinyl posters supporting the Russo-Ukraine War cover the construction fences.

Organization
The embassy consists of the following sections:

 Political Section
 Management Section
 Regional Security Office
 Economic Affairs Section
 Public Affairs Section
 Consular Section
 Environment, Science, Technology, & Health Section
 Law Enforcement Section

In addition, representatives of several U.S. federal agencies work in the embassy.

There are no consulates in Russia.

Old building

From 1934 to 1953, the embassy was located in the Mokhovaya House, 13 Mokhovaya Street, near the Kremlin. In 1953, the embassy moved into the Existing Office Building (EOB) on Novinskiy Boulevard, which still remains a part of the embassy compound, although it is several miles away from the main embassy.

During the period 1953–76, the Soviets irradiated the U.S. Embassy in Moscow with microwaves in the Moscow Signal incident.

In 1964, covert listening devices were discovered within the U.S. Embassy in Moscow.

On August 26, 1977, a fire erupted on the eighth floor of the embassy building. Although it was extinguished, a large amount of information was lost or stolen (several firefighters were in fact KGB personnel charged with removing sensitive material.)

New building

Bugging 

Construction of a new chancery began in 1979, with planning having started ten years prior as part of the Cold War détente but delayed due to American dissatisfaction with the sites and conditions, with the Soviet Union being perceived to have gotten the upper hand in negotiations. As part of a 1972 agreement, most of the compound was built by Soviet workers.

A team led by Skidmore, Owings & Merrill architect Charles Bassett designed the new embassy, which was "self-contained", having residences, a school and a shopping center along with office space, and had a red brick exterior to "convey some American flavor".

In 1985, the building's columns and walls were found to be riddled with listening devices to such an extent that classified information had to be handled in the old embassy. Construction was halted and all Soviet workers were kicked out. Additionally, Soviet diplomats were not allowed to occupy their new chancery in Washington, D.C., in retaliation. The standoff was resolved in 1994 when American workers were allowed to dismantle partially and rebuild the chancery, replacing the top three floors with four completely new ones.

Construction completed in 2000 
In May 2000, the construction of the new building was completed, and the new building was finally opened in June 2000 with classified business confined to the upper floors, while standard consular business is conducted in the insecure lower floors.

The perimeter of the entire complex is 1320 meters. In 2013, construction began on a new office building with a total area of 24,200 square meters.

On January 16, 2018, the consular department was opened in the new building, and the reception of visitors began.

Security and espionage 
"The NSA is a global electronic vacuum cleaner, which monitors everything. Look at the top two floors of the new building of the U.S. Embassy—it's a huge antenna, which listens to the Moscow air," according to Igor Korotchenko in 2013, on a Russian television program. Korotchenko is editor of a magazine called National Defense and a former specialist in Russia's military command. Vedomosti newspaper, citing a source in the Russian special services, stated that the embassy is likely to host the local server of X-Keyscore, an Internet surveillance system.

Secretary of State Rex Tillerson hired Elite Security Holdings, a Russian company associated with Victor Budanov, a KGB general involved in counterintelligence who was a boss of Vladimir Putin, to guard all United States diplomatic missions in Russia, which are located in four cities, including the United States Embassy in Moscow, according to The New York Times on November 14, 2017.

New street name 
On June 22, 2022, in response to Russia's invasion of Ukraine and the renaming of the street on which the Russian embassy in the U.S. resides, the U.S. embassy in Moscow block and address was renamed Donetsk People's Republic Square, according to the press service of the Moscow Mayor's Office. Subsequently, the Embassy's official website refused to utilize the new address for contact information and instead listed the official address as "U.S. Embassy Moscow
55,75566° N, 37,58028° E".

Other properties
The embassy once oversaw two Consulates General in Russia: Vladivostok and Yekaterinburg. Today, the website states: "Due to critically low staffing of the United States Mission to Russia, the U.S. Consulate General in Vladivostok and the U.S. Consulate General in Yekaterinburg remain in suspended status."

In addition to the buildings on Novinsky Boulevard / Bolshoy Devyatinsky Lane , the United States also owns, on a leasehold basis, the Vtorov's Mansion (the so-called Spaso House by the Americans after the engineer Spaso House). Since 1933, this has housed the ambassador's residence.

Before August 1, 2017, the U.S. also owned a dacha in Serebryany Bor and warehouses on Dorozhnaya Street. In 2017, their use was prohibited in response to the expulsion of 35 Russian diplomats from the United States and sanctions.

Ambassadors
The position of United States Ambassador to Russia was previously held by John Sullivan until his resignation on September 4, 2022.

See also

 Diplomatic missions in Russia
 Diplomatic missions of the United States
 Russia–United States relations
 Soviet Union–United States relations
 Embassy of Russia in Washington, D.C.

References

External links

 U.S. Embassy & Consulates in Russia—United States Department of State

United States
Moscow
Soviet Union–United States relations
Russia–United States relations